Babasaheb Naik College of Engineering (BNCoE), Pusad, founded in 1983, is a not-for-profit engineering college run by the Janta Shikshan Prasharak Mandal, located at Pusad, Yeotmal District in Vidarbha region of the state of Maharashtra, India.

History
Janta Shikshan Prasarak Mandal was established and registered as a society in 1960. The Founder President of JSPM was Late Shri. Vasantrao Naik - the former Chief Minister of Maharashtra (1963 to 1975), and the Founder Secretary was Sudhakarrao Naik - the former Chief Ministers of Maharashtra (1991 to 1993) and former Governor of Himachal Pradesh (1994 to 1995). In 1961, the JSPM started Phulsing Naik Mahavidyalaya at Pusad with an enrollment of 100 student.

in 1983–84, the JSPM started Babasaheb Naik College of Engineering (BNCOE). In 1984–1985, the JSPM started Sudhakarrao Naik Institute of Pharmacy, and Dr. NP Hirani Institute of Polytechnic. In 1991, the JSPM started JSPM College of Physical Education.

As of 2014, JSPM runs 22 schools, colleges and hostels. Today JSPM society imparts quality education to more than 10,000 students every year.

Location

Nearest railway station are at Nanded -  for south bound, Akola - 140,  from Hingoli and Washim  for west & south bound, Wardha -  for north bound and Nagpur -  for north and east bound passengers.

Other airports nearby with no regular scheduled commercial flights are Yavatmal Airport at Yavatmal - , Shri Guru Gobind Singh Ji Airport at Nanded - , Akola Airport at Akola - , Amravati Airport at Amravati - , and Osmanabad Airport at Osmanabad - .

Affiliations and accreditation
BNCoE, Pusad is affiliated to the Sant Gadge Baba Amravati University which is recognized under Section 12(B) of the University Grants Commission (UGC) Act of Ministry of Human Resource Development (India), Government of India as well as accredited by the National Assessment and Accreditation Council (NAAC) (Permanent AICTE Application#: 1-4318017). Sant Gadge Baba Amravati University is an associate member of the Association of Commonwealth Universities, London. Independent recognition of BNCoE, Pusad by University Grants Commission (UGC) makes it eligible for the UGC grants for the schemes related to students and teachers.

BNCoE, Pusad is accredited by the All India Council for Technical Education and its successor National Board of Accreditation (NBA) for running undergraduate and postgraduate courses in various branches of engineering.

BNCoE, Pusad is ISO 9001- 2008 certified, accredited by Institution of Engineers (India) and has been awarded 'GRADE A' by the Government of Maharashtra.

BNCoE, Pusad Laboratory facilities have been recognized as PhD-level by the Sant Gadge Baba Amravati University. Though BNCoE, Pusad itself does not directly offer any PhD courses but this recognition allows its staff to pursue PhD courses while using college laboratory facilities for the research.

BNCoE, Pusad is ranked 23rd in Computer Science & Engineering and 29th in Mechanical Engineering among nearly 9,000 engineering colleges in India as per an all India survey done by the SiliconIndia. The same SiliconIndia survey also ranked BNCoE, Pusad 8th in Western India . It is considered one of the top engineering college in Maharashtra state by the 3rd party independent sources.

Courses
The college runs Bachelor of Engineering (BE)and Master of Engineering courses.

Bachelor of Engineering (BE) courses
The college has 1st year intake of 660 in the Bachelor of Engineering (BE) courses of minimum 4 years duration in the following academic disciplines:

Master of Engineering (ME) courses
The college has 1st year intake of 18 students (total 52) in each of the following Master of Engineering courses of minimum 2 years (4 semester) duration.

Facilities
The college has  of buildings spread over a  campus which has the following on-site facilities:

Teaching, laboratories, and research
 Auditorium: 750-seats centrally air-cooled auditorium
 Classrooms: nearly 100 classrooms and labs spread across several buildings of Computer & IT block, Electronics and Electrical block, Civil & Mechanical block, Workshops and Admin block
 Electricity: 24 Hrs. Electric Supply through express feeder with a 140 kVA backup Generator, college has also set up a Hybride Energy park with Solar Energy and Windmill
 Internet: campus-wide 4 Mbit/s leased line internet and intranet connecting 1000+ computers, Wi-Fi Language lab, live lectures are delivered from IIT Bombay
 Laboratory: 72 well furnished lab facilities, with equipment worth INR8+ crore, have been recognized as PhD-level by the Sant Gadge Baba Amravati University, this allows the students staff to pursue undergraduate, ME and PhD-level research
 Library: Well equipped 1500 sq. meter LAN-connected computerized Digital Library with 11000+ titles, 60000+ books, 27 national and 450 international journals, reading space for 200 members, audio-video facilities, free book bank for 700 meritorious & Scheduled Castes and Scheduled Tribes (SC/CT) students, 30 internet terminals with 45Mbit/s bandwidth connection, photocopy facilities and more than 1500 international E-journals (IEEE, ASME, ASCE), etc. Library is open 24 hours during the exams. Further expansion of library is planned in 2014–2015 with addition of 4500 sq meter air-conditioned reading space on the 1st floor as well as more class rooms on top of the library.
 Teaching staff of 181 includes 23 professors, 48 Assistant professors and 120 lecturers with a student-teacher ratio of 10:1 in 2017
 Competitive examination: Special classes for the GATE, GRE, TOEFL, etc.
 Campus placement Department: organizes campus placement drives with employers (e.g. Indian Army, Indian Navy, Cognizant, IBM, Infosys, TCS, etc.) and provides training in employability, soft-skills, interviewing skills and guidance for the higher education in India and overseas

Accommodation
 Hostels: 4 boys' & 2 girls' hostels that can accommodate about 992 & 350 students respectively, All six hostels have internet connectivity, Mess (dining hall) and own separate large Recreation Halls with Newspaper & Reading Rooms and various games such as Table tennis, Badminton court, Carom, Chess, TV, etc.
 Faculty Accommodation: 38 residential units for married teaching staff members and a bungalow for the Principal
 Guesthouse accommodation: 5 (air conditioned) units with attached ensuite bathroom for guests, parents and other visitors

Sports
 Gymnasium - one multi-gym in the basement of computer science hostel
 Badminton - 1 indoor court in each of the 6 hostels
 Basketball - 1 outdoor concrete court
 Judo & Karate - coaching classes are held for students
 Table tennis - 2 tables in each of the 6 hostels
 Lawn Tennis - 2 outdoor courts with floodlights
 Volleyball - 2 outdoor courts
 One multipurpose ground for athletics, cricket, football, handball, hockey, kabaddi, kho kho, and softball
 Annual sports competition among hostels on special occasions
 Annual sports festival & competition Gaiety among students
 Participation in District, university and state sports competitions

Cultural and social facilities
 Arts: Arts Club, Drama club and Music Club
 Cultural events: Annual Cultural festival & competition Gaiety and Youth Festival
 Religious Festivals: Officials events are held to celebrate the Ganesha Chaturthi Festival, Holi Festival, Iftar Party, Krishna Janmashtami, Lohri Festival, New Year Party and Saraswati Pooja
 Social learning: NSS, ISTE Chapter, IE (India) Chapter, Path Finders Club and Quiz Club
 Venues include Auditorium, Open air theater, Recreation Halls, library and grounds

Board of Management
The longest-serving former Chief Minister of Maharashtra late Vasantrao Naik was the founder chairman of the Janta Shikshan Prasarak Mandal and its various educational institutes, including the Babasaheb Naik College of Engineering, Pusad. After him, his nephews late Sudhakarrao Naik (also a former Chief Minister of Maharashtra) and his brother Manohar Naik (current 2014-2019 MLA from Pusad) served as the members of the managing committee.

Sister organizations
The Janata Shikshan Prasarak Mandal (JSPM), along with BNCOE, has also founded the following educational institutes:

Professional Institutes

Degree Colleges

'Schools in Pusad city

Outside Pusad city agglomeration

In popular culture
BNCOE is the location of Anna's Canteen novel written by 1988-91 BNCOE alumni Charanjit Singh Minhas. The BNCOE Pusad song pays tribute to the life of students at BNCOE.

See also

 BNCOE Pusad song, with 1988-92 pictures when campus was still developing and admin block was still under construction
 Video collage of BNCOE pictures till 2016
 Kumar Vishwas show at BNCOE in 2016
 Maitri reunion of 1983-87 batch held at Chikhaldara in 2017, video length: 1.12 hours
 Gaiety 2010 dance performance

References

External links
 

Engineering colleges in Maharashtra

Yavatmal district
Educational institutions established in 1983
1983 establishments in Maharashtra